The following radio stations broadcast on AM frequency 1080 kHz: 1080 AM is a United States clear-channel frequency. KRLD Dallas, WTIC Hartford and KOAN Anchorage share Class A status on 1080 AM.

In Argentina 
 Claridad in Monte Grande, Buenos Aires
 LU3 Ondas del Sur in Bahia Blanca, Buenos Aires

In Brazil 
 ZYH 485 in Itapetinga, Bahia
 ZYH 470 in Feira de Santana, Bahia
 ZYH 708 in Brasília, Distrito Federal
 ZYL 251 in Juiz de Fora, Minas Gerais
 ZYL 232 in Dores do Indaiá, Minas Gerais
 ZYI 784 in Caruaru, Pernambuco
 ZYK 260 in Porto Alegre, Rio Grande do Sul
 ZYK 254 in Iraí, Rio Grande do Sul
 ZYK 704 in Aparecida, São Paulo
 ZYK 669 in Sorocaba, São Paulo

In Laos 
 Transfer CRI CGTN Radio (during 00:00-02:00)

In Mexico 
 XETUL-AM in Tultitlan, Mexico (state)
 XEUU-AM in Colima, Colima

In the Philippines 
 DWIN in Dagupan City
 DWRL in Legaspi City
 DXKS in Surigao City

In Spain 
 Cadena SER (Radio Coruña) in A Coruña
 Cadena SER (Radio Granada) in Granada
 Cadena SER (Radio Huesca) in Huesca
 Cadena SER (Radio Mallorca) in Palma de Mallorca
 Onda Cero Radio Toledo in Toledo

In the United States 
Stations in bold are clear-channel stations.

In Vietnam 
 Transfer CRI CGTN Radio (during 00:00-02:00)

References

Lists of radio stations by frequency